Ablation Point, also known as Punta Ablación, is the eastern extremity of a hook-shaped rock ridge marking the north side of the entrance to Ablation Valley, on the east coast of Alexander Island, Antarctica. It was first photographed from the air on 23 November 1935 by Lincoln Ellsworth and mapped from these photographs by W.L.G. Joerg. It was roughly surveyed in 1936 by the British Graham Land Expedition (BGLE) and resurveyed in 1949 by the Falkland Islands Dependencies Survey (FIDS). It was named by FIDS for nearby Ablation Valley. The site lies within Antarctic Specially Protected Area (ASPA) No.147.

See also
Ablation Lake

References

Headlands of Alexander Island
Antarctic Specially Protected Areas